Chrdilo-Chiprani (Tsægat Tsipran) is a settlement in the Dzau district of South Ossetia.

See also
 Dzau district

References 

Populated places in Dzau District